Cyclamen is a color that is a representation of the color of cyclamens. It is named after the flower.

The year of the first recorded use of cyclamen as a color name in English is currently unknown.

See also
 List of colors

References